Joseph Flintoft Berry (May 13, 1856 – February 11, 1931) was a bishop of the Methodist Episcopal Church, elected in 1904.

Birth and family
Joseph was born 13 May 1856 in Aylmer, Ontario, Canada, the son of the Rev. Francis and Ann Berry.  He was the brother of Dr. H.G. Berry.  Joseph was married to Olive J. Johnson.

Education
Joseph was educated at the Milton Academy in Ontario.  He was led to Christ by two young friends, who took him to his father's barn and there held a prayer-meeting.  This resulted in Joseph's glorious conversion. 
  
Joseph entered the Ordained Ministry of the M.E. Church in 1874.  Joseph came to Mount Clemens, Michigan in 1879 to pastor the First M.E. Church.  He served as the Associate Editor of the Michigan Christian Advocate, 1885–90.  He also served as Editor of the Epworth Herald, the official publication of the Epworth League, 1890–1904.

March 5, 1924, it was reported that Bishop Berry of Philadelphia told the New Jersey Methodist Conference that "every Methodist preacher has as much right to belong to the Ku Klux Klan as to Masons or Odd Fellows if he thinks it is a proper thing to do."

Bishop Berry served the Buffalo, New York Episcopal Area (Genesee Annual Conference) for eight years.  He then served the Philadelphia Area until retirement.  His retirement was spent in Winter Park, Florida, where he died 11 February 1931 at the age of 74.  His body was brought back to Mount Clemens, Michigan to be buried with his two sons who had died during his pastorate there.  His father, mother and wife are also buried in his cemetery lot.

See also
List of bishops of the United Methodist Church

References
"News of the Night in Brief" Fitchburg Sentinel (Fitchburg, Massachusetts) March 5, 1924, page 13. Access date April 16, 2017.
Aylmer Express, 19 February 1931, page 7.  Index to the Aylmer Express newspaper, 1930–1934, Aylmer, Ontario, Canada.
"Berry, Joseph F.," in The New Schaff-Herzog Encyclopedia of Religious Knowledge, Samuel Macauley Jackson, D.D., LL.D., Editor-in-Chief.  Grand Rapids, Michigan:  Baker Book House, 1952.
McGhee, C. Bernard, The Founders and Builders of Mount Clemens.
Mahood, J.W. (Evangelist), The Art of Soul-Winning (Specially Adapted for Personal Workers), Cincinnati:  Jennings & Pye, New York:  Easton & Mains, 1901.
St. Thomas Times-Journal, 12 February 1931, page 1.  Extractions of names for Births, Marriages, Deaths and Burials (extracted and transcribed by members of the Elgin OGS), St. Thomas, Ontario, Canada.

Further reading
 Joseph F. Berry and Charles H. Gabriel (1914), edd., Hymns of the Heart, New York:  Methodist Book Concern.

References

American Methodist Episcopal bishops
Bishops of the Methodist Episcopal Church
1856 births
1931 deaths
Canadian bishops
Editors of Christian publications
People from Elgin County
Canadian emigrants to the United States
Canadian Methodists
20th-century Methodist bishops
Burials in Michigan